Big Rock is an unincorporated community in Stewart County, Tennessee, United States. Its ZIP code is 37023.

Demographics

Notes

Unincorporated communities in Stewart County, Tennessee
Unincorporated communities in Tennessee